Topper is an American fantasy sitcom television series based on the 1937 film Topper, which was based on two novels Topper and Topper Takes a Trip by Thorne Smith. The series was broadcast on CBS from October 9, 1953, to July 15, 1955, and stars Leo G. Carroll in the title role. It finished at #24 in the Nielsen ratings for the 1954–1955 season. Topper also earned an Emmy nomination for Best Situation Comedy in 1954.

Synopsis
Sophisticated but stuffy Cosmo Topper (Carroll) is the vice president of City Bank, married to sweet but rather clueless Henrietta (Lee Patrick). They live in a Los Angeles house they bought from the estate of a young couple, George and Marion Kerby (real life husband and wife Robert Sterling and Anne Jeffreys). The Kerbys died while skiing when they were buried by an avalanche. A St. Bernard dog, Neil, who attempted to rescue them also died with them. Topper discovers his new home is haunted by the ghosts of the former occupants as well as Neil. Strangely, he is the only one able to see or hear them. Neil, the St. Bernard, loves martinis and a running gag is the invisible dog lapping up the drink.

The Kerbys try to bring some excitement and joy into the life of stodgy and conservative Topper. The ghosts cause strange (but humorous) events to happen, which an embarrassed Cosmo has to try to explain to others baffledand even frightenedby them.

Cast

Main
 Anne Jeffreys as Marion Kerby
 Robert Sterling as George Kerby
 Leo G. Carroll as Cosmo Topper
 Lee Patrick as Henrietta Topper
 Buck as Neil

Recurring
 Thurston Hall as Mr. Schuyler, President of City Bank
 Kathleen Freeman as Katie (season 1)
 Edna Skinner as Maggie (season 2)

Production

The Broadway composer and lyricist Stephen Sondheim wrote eleven episodes for Toppers first season with George Oppenheimer. The show's producer was John W. Loveton, with his agent, Bernard L. Schubert, credited as co-producer.

R.J. Reynolds Tobacco's Camel cigarettes was the show's sponsor; the Kerbys were seen smoking in every episode, as required by Reynolds; the actors, along with Carroll, also appeared in integrated commercials promoting the product at the end of the show, as well as announcing where free cartons of Camels were being sent to various military bases and veterans hospitals each week. Both ABC and NBC aired repeats of these episodes (ABC in 1955 and NBC in 1956).

There were at least three forms of the opening announcement:
"CamelAmerica's first choice among cigarettespresents Topper'''. Starringas Marion Kerby, the loveliest ghost in townAnne Jeffreys. As George Kerby, the liveliest ghost in townRobert Sterling. And Leo G. Carroll as Topper [a dog bark is heard]. Oh, yes, and ahh... the deadliest ghost, Neil".

In another opening, the announcer adds, "And there are only three people in the world who can see or hear themyou and I... and Cosmo Topper".
 
When Topper was shown in repeats, Anne Jeffreys was introduced as "the ghostess with the mostest"; Robert Sterling as "that most sporty spirit", and Leo G. Carroll as "host to said ghosts".

Episodes
Season 1 (1953–54)

Season 2 (1954–55)

Broadcast and syndicationTopper was popular in syndication for more than a decade. Camel commercials and their references were removed but the characters could still be seen smoking them.

Home media
There are 11 episodes in the public domain which have been released on DVD but the series has not been given a full release.

See also
 The Adventures of Topper 
 Topper (film)
 Topper Takes a Trip Topper Returns''
 List of ghost films

References

External links
 
 
 
 

1953 American television series debuts
1955 American television series endings
1950s American sitcoms
Black-and-white American television shows
CBS original programming
English-language television shows
American fantasy television series
Fantasy comedy television series
Ghosts in television
Live action television shows based on films
Television series based on adaptations
Television series by CBS Studios
Television shows set in Los Angeles